Mam Tor Publishing is an English independent comic book publisher founded by Liam Sharp and his wife Christina McCormack. The company's headquarters are in Derby, East Midlands.

History

During 2004, Mam Tor Publishing was established by Liam & Christina McCormack-Sharp to publish Sharpenings, The Art of Liam Sharp. It, a personal artbook featuring previously unreleased art samples of Sharp, was initially a portfolio showcase he could send publishers.

Mam Tor has published the anthology Mam Tor: Event Horizon.

Currently Mam Tor is releasing stand-alone graphic novels, like Matt Coyle's Worry Doll and Sharp's Lap Of The Gods, as well as developing other properties for comics, books, and film.

They have just started publishing a quarterly free comic given away in Time Out. Four Feet From a Rat is a 16-page comic comprising 4 stories, all written by the advertising company Mother, Stories in the first issue are "The Crane Gods" Liam Sharp, "The Little Guy" by Chris Weston, "Routemaster" by Dave Kendall and "Don Pigeone" by Kev Crossley. The third issue got press attention thanks to the story illustrated by Roger Langridge "Young Boris," which featured the adventures of London mayor Boris Johnson.

Mam Tor: Event Horizon

The books mascot Viking Zombie Elvis, who opens and closes each book has made the leap from the printed page to (undead) life in the shlock mock rock doc "Paul Hammond's Rumours of Ragnorok? a Historiography"

Mam Tor are now in production with various other media projects, including the above-mentioned Zombie Elvis feature.

Publications
Sharpenings: The Art of Liam Sharp
Mam Tor: Event Horizon:
 #1 (140 pages, May 2005)
 #2 (208 pages, November 2005)
Life Is Humiliation #1, #2
Worry Doll — (graphic novel by Matt Coyle, January 2007)
Lap of the Gods — (collection of personal works by Liam Sharp)
St. Cyborg's — (by Nick Wray, 168 pages, January 2008)
The Enemy's Son — Erth Chronicles Book I (by James Johnson, May 2008)
Four Feet From A Rat — (Quarterly comic supplement in Time Out London magazine, March 2008 - )
God Killers – Machivarius Point & Other Stories - (Novel and short stories by Liam Sharp, May 2009)

Awards
 2006: 
 Won Best Graphic Novel, Sci-Fi London, for Mam Tor: Event Horizon
 2007:
 Won Best Comic Book Artist, Rue Morgue Award, for Matt Coyle's Worry Doll
 Nominated Best British Colour Comic, Eagle Awards, for Mam Tor: Event Horizon

Creators
Liam Sharp
Steve Niles
Ashley Wood
Chris Weston
Dan Wickline
Kody Chamberlain
Tom Muller
Shane McCarthy
Emma Simcock-Tooth
Kev Crossley
Gary Erskine
Glenn Fabry
Simon Bisley
Emily Hare
Dave Kendall
Matt Dixon
Greg Staples
John Bamber
Matt Boyce
Alan Grant
Brem
Douglas Rushkoff
Ali Powers
Matt Coyle
Nick Wray

Notes

References

External links
 Profile at About.com

Reviews
 Maxim Online reviews Event Horizon 1 (bottom of the page)
 SFF World Reviews Event Horizon 1
 SFF World Reviews Event Horizon 2
Sci-Fi London reviews Event Horizon 2

Comic book publishing companies of the United Kingdom
2004 establishments in the United Kingdom
Publishing companies established in 2004